Sergei Aleksandrovich Vasyanovich (born 8 July 1982) is a former Russian professional footballer.

Club career
He made his professional debut in the Russian Second Division in 2000 for FC Zenit-2 St. Petersburg.

Honours
 Russian Premier League bronze: 2001.
 Russian Premier League Cup winner: 2003.

References

1982 births
Living people
Russian footballers
Association football midfielders
Russian Premier League players
FC Zenit Saint Petersburg players
FC Metallurg Lipetsk players
FC Petrotrest players
FC Zenit-2 Saint Petersburg players